Earl Johnson may refer to:

Earl Johnson (American football), head college football coach at Doane College
Earl Johnson (baseball) (1919–1994), Major League Baseball and World War II hero
Earl Johnson (fiddler) (1886–1965), fiddler in 1920s North Georgia
Earl Johnson (runner) (born 1891), cross-country athlete, winner of two medals in 1924
Earl Johnson, American musician better known as Earl St. Clair
Earl Johnson, guitarist in the band Moxy
Earl Zero (Earl Anthony Johnson, born 1953), Jamaican reggae singer
Earl Johnson (ice hockey) (1931–2015), National Hockey League player
Earl V. Johnson (1913–1942), U.S. Navy officer
Earl D. Johnson (1905–1990), U.S. Under Secretary of the Army, 1952–54
Earl F. Johnson (1868–1947), Michigan politician